"Kevin" Pu Jun Jin (born 17 June 1984) is a Chinese racing driver currently competing in the TCR Asia Series. Having previously competed in the Asian Formula Renault Series, Asian Le Mans Series and European Le Mans Series amongst others.

Racing career
Pu began his career in 2011 in karting. In 2012 he switched to the Volkswagen Scirocco R Cup China. He raced in the Formula Masters China championship from 2013–14, at the same time he also competed in the Asian Le Mans Series finishing 2nd in the LMP2 championship standings in 2014. In 2014 he also in raced in the Asian Formula Renault Series, he finished the season 4th in the championship standings. In 2015 he switched to the European Le Mans Series finishing 10th in the championship standings that year.

In October 2015 it was announced that he would race in the TCR Asia Series & TCR International Series, driving a SEAT León Cup Racer for Asia Racing Team.

Racing record

Complete European Le Mans Series results
(key) (Races in bold indicate pole position) (Races in italics indicate fastest lap)

Complete TCR International Series results
(key) (Races in bold indicate pole position) (Races in italics indicate fastest lap)

24 Hours of Le Mans results

References

External links
 

1984 births
Living people
TCR Asia Series drivers
TCR International Series drivers
European Le Mans Series drivers
Chinese racing drivers
24 Hours of Le Mans drivers
Asian Le Mans Series drivers
Asian Formula Renault Challenge drivers
Asia Racing Team drivers
Eurasia Motorsport drivers
Formula Masters China drivers
20th-century Chinese people
21st-century Chinese people
People from Foshan
24H Series drivers